Viltov is a rural locality (a khutor) in Logovskoye Rural Settlement, Ilovlinsky District, Volgograd Oblast, Russia. The population was 178 as of 2010. There are 5 streets.

Geography 
Viltov is located in steppe, 36 km northwest of Ilovlya (the district's administrative centre) by road. Novogrigoryevskaya is the nearest rural locality.

References 

Rural localities in Ilovlinsky District